Arachidicoccus soli is a Gram-negative, aerobic, rod-shaped and non-motile bacterium from the genus of Arachidicoccus which has been isolated from soil from the Hodo island in Korea.

References

 Chitinophagia
Bacteria described in 2020